Just Before The Bullets Fly is  the fifth studio solo album by Gregg Allman and the third album released under the Gregg Allman Band monicker.  It was released on Epic Records in 1988.  The album peaked at number 117 in the Billboard 200 chart.

Track listing 
"Demons"  (Gregg Allman, Dan Toler, David Toler) – 3:28
"Before the Bullets Fly" (Warren Haynes, John Jaworowicz, Williams) – 3:41
"Slip Away"  (William Armstrong, Marcus Daniel, Wilbur Terrell) – 4:31
"Thorn and a Wild Rose"  (Tony Colton, Dan Toler, Bruce Waibel) – 4:14
"Ocean Awash the Gunwale" was written after Gregg Allman overdosed. He mentions this in his memoir “My Cross To Bear”. (Pages 152–153) (Gregg Allman, Tony Colton, Dan Toler) – 4:53
"Can't Get Over You"  (Billy Burnette, David Malloy) – 3:28
"Island"  (Gregg Allman, Tony Colton, Johnny Neel, Dan Toler) - 4:17
"Fear of Falling"  (Gregg Allman, Tim Heding, John Townsend) – 3:35
"Night Games"  (Gregg Allman, Tony Colton, Dan Toler) – 3:53
"Every Hungry Woman"  (Gregg Allman) – 4:33

Personnel 
Gregg Allman – Keyboards, Hammond Organ, Lead Vocals
Tim Heding – Keyboards, Background Vocals
Dan Toler – Guitar, Keyboards
Bruce Waibel – Bass Guitar, Background Vocals
David Frankie Toler – Drums
Chaz Trippy – Percussion

Production 
Michael Caplan – Executive Producer
Rodney Mills – Producer, Engineer, Mixing
Christopher Austopchuk – Art Direction
Caroline Greyshock – Photography
Jeffrey Dean – Set Design
Mike Gallo – Electronics
William Perkins – Direction

References 

1988 albums
Gregg Allman albums
Albums produced by Rodney Mills
Epic Records albums